Kosuke Onose (小野瀬 康介, born 22 April 1993) is a Japanese football player for J1 League club Gamba Osaka. He has previously played for J2 League sides Yokohama FC and Renofa Yamaguchi. His playing position is a winger or an attacking midfielder.

Club career

Onose came through the youth ranks at J2 League club Yokohama FC and made the first team ahead of the 2011 season.   He spent a total of 6 seasons at the Mitsuzawa Stadium scoring 10 times in over 100 league games.

He switched to fellow J2 side Renofa Yamaguchi in 2017 and after netting 6 times in 41 league games he enjoyed a breakout season in 2018 scoring 10 goals in 25 matches in the first half of the year which brought him to the attention of J1 side Gamba Osaka.

Onose signed for Gamba Osaka on the last day of July 2018 and was handed the number 50 jersey.   He debuted as a second-half substitute for Shu Kurata in a 3-2 loss away to Nagoya Grampus on 5 August 2018 and played a total of 14 league and 2 J.League Cup games prior to the end of the season, scoring 3 goals in the process.

Career statistics

Updated to 1 January 2021.

References

External links
Profile at Renofa Yamaguchi

1993 births
Living people
Association football people from Tokyo
Japanese footballers
Japan youth international footballers
J1 League players
J2 League players
Yokohama FC players
Renofa Yamaguchi FC players
Gamba Osaka players
Association football midfielders